Ain’t No Trip to Cleveland Vol. 1 is a 2013 live album by United States indie/roots folk band Dispatch consisting of songs taken from performances since their reformation in 2011. The record was announced on April 22, 2013 on the band’s website and via a song premiere on Rolling Stone. Made available the same day, the pre-order includes various bundle packages.

Track listing 
Disc #1 track listing: 
 Get Ready Boy
 Open Up
 Circles Around the Sun
 Flying Horses
 Beto
 Passerby
 Two Coins
 Broken American
 Prince of Spades
 Mother & Child Reunion
 Josaphine
 Walk With You
 The General

Disc #2 track listing: 
 Con Man
 Here We Go
 Bats in the Belfry
 Flag
 Sign of the Times
 Bang Bang
 Never or Now
 Melon Bend
 Past the Falls
 Feels So Good
 Outloud
 Valentine
 Elias

References

2013 live albums
Dispatch live albums